Georg Ludwig Rudolf Maercker (21 September 1865 in Baldenburg – 31 December 1924 in Dresden) was a German general of World War I.

Following the Armistice of 1918 that saw the end of fighting and of the Bolshevik revolution that led to the creation of the Soviet Union, there were many examples of disturbances throughout Germany. Maercker suggested the formation of Freikorps (Free Corps) to suppress these and a number of formations formed themselves, usually around individual army officers.
After leaving the Freikorps, Maercker became active in Der Stahlhelm group and was the president of the Saxony chapter. In 1924, Maercker together with Theodor Duesterberg was a leader of the anti-Semitic fraction within the Stahhelm who wanted an "Aryan clause" that would ban Jews from joining the Stahlhelm and expel the current Jewish members. In March 1924, Maercker and Duesterberg got their way and forced Franz Seldte to adopt the "Aryan clause" and expel all Jews from the Stahlhelm.

References

Major generals of Prussia
German Army generals of World War I
1865 births
1924 deaths
People from Szczecinek County
People of the Weimar Republic
People from West Prussia
German anti-communists
Major generals of the Reichswehr
Schutztruppe personnel
Recipients of the Pour le Mérite (military class)